The 1968–69 Segunda División season was the 38th since its establishment and was played between 8 September 1968 and 8 June 1969.

Overview before the season
20 teams joined the league, including two relegated from the 1967–68 La Liga and 5 promoted from the 1967–68 Tercera División.

Relegated from La Liga
Real Betis
Sevilla

Promoted from Tercera División

Indauchu
Alavés
Onteniente
Ilicitano
Jerez Industrial

Teams

League table

Top goalscorers

Top goalkeepers

Results

Relegation playoffs

First leg

Second leg

Tiebreaker

External links
BDFútbol

Segunda División seasons
2
Spain